Aleksandr Konstantinovich Dreval (born 17 July 1944 in Moscow) is a Russian water polo player who competed for the Soviet Union in the 1972 and 1976 Summer Olympics.

See also
 Soviet Union men's Olympic water polo team records and statistics
 List of Olympic champions in men's water polo
 List of Olympic medalists in water polo (men)
 List of world champions in men's water polo
 List of World Aquatics Championships medalists in water polo

External links
 

1944 births
Living people
Soviet male water polo players
Russian male water polo players
Olympic water polo players of the Soviet Union
Water polo players at the 1972 Summer Olympics
Water polo players at the 1976 Summer Olympics
Olympic gold medalists for the Soviet Union
Olympic medalists in water polo
Sportspeople from Moscow
Medalists at the 1972 Summer Olympics